John Hetherington is a presumed apocryphal English haberdasher, often credited as the inventor of the top hat, which is said to have caused a riot when he first wore it in public on 15 January 1797.

The story
The common form of the story, as reproduced in many books, has it that he was arraigned before the Lord Mayor on 15 January 1797 on a charge of breach of the peace and inciting a riot, and was required to post a £500 bond. Reportedly he had "appeared on the public highway wearing upon his head what he called a silk hat (which was shiny lustre and calculated to frighten timid people)" and the officers of the Crown stated that "several women fainted at the unusual sight, while children screamed, dogs yelped and a younger son of Cordwainer Thomas was thrown down by the crowd which collected and had his right arm broken".

Origin
The story first appeared in a late 1890s edition of the Hatters' Gazette: in 1899 the quarterly journal Notes and Queries reported the story, noting that it originated in "a recent number of the Hatters' Gazette".

Later accounts also attribute the story to the Hatters' Gazette – however, both the Australian Law Review of 1927, and The Dearborn Independent in its "I Read in the Papers" column of 8 January 1927, erroneously describe it as being reported in a 1797 edition of the Hatters' Gazette (The Dearborn Independent specifying it more narrowly as 16 January 1797 edition) – obviously an error, as the Hatters' Gazette only began publication in 1878.

The Canberra Times for 10 June 1927 reproduced the usual account, with an introduction saying, "During a discussion in the columns of 'The Times' (London) on the pioneer of umbrellas, a correspondent sent an extract from an old journal in her possession, dated 16 January 1797, giving the following amusing account of the wearing of the first silk hat in London". It is not known which "old journal" is referred to, but as noted above it cannot be the Hatters' Gazette.

Notes

Sources
Berendt, John. "History of the Top Hat". International Formalwear Association.
Jordinson, Sam. "Annus Horribilis: A Chronicle of Comic Mishaps." John Murray.
BBC News "Changing the Flaws In London Laws"

Year of birth missing
Year of death missing
English fashion designers
Pseudohistory